The table below lists the largest municipalities in Colombia by population, using data from the most recent population census of Colombia in 2005.

Municipalities by population
 Population
Municipalities by population